Patrizia Bisi (born Rome) is an Italian writer. She was the recipient of the Rapallo Carige Prize for Daimon in 2005.

References

Italian women novelists
21st-century Italian women writers
21st-century Italian novelists
20th-century Italian novelists
20th-century Italian women writers
Writers from Rome
Year of birth missing (living people)
Living people